Pretty Much Your Standard Ranch Stash is American singer-songwriter Michael Nesmith's sixth album of his post-Monkees career. Released in September 1973, it was his final album for RCA Records and did not chart.

"Some of Shelly's Blues" was written by Nesmith as a potential Monkees release during his 1968 Nashville sessions. That version remained unissued until the 1990s. "Some of Shelly's Blues" was also recorded previously by both the Stone Poneys and the Nitty Gritty Dirt Band on their 1970 album Uncle Charlie & His Dog Teddy.

The song "Winonah" marks the first time Nesmith co-wrote a song with collaborating songwriters since the Monkees song "The Kind of Girl I Could Love" (featured on the album More of the Monkees).

On the cover of the album, in small print, are the words "buy this record". On the CD, the words have been altered to "buy this compact disc".

Pretty Much Your Standard Ranch Stash was Nesmith's final album for RCA Records. The album, was later re-released on the Pacific Arts label and subsequently on CD by multiple labels. It was reissued coupled with And the Hits Just Keep on Comin' by RCA/BMG in 2000.

Track listing
 "Continuing" (Michael Nesmith) – 3:55
 "Some of Shelly's Blues" (Michael Nesmith) – 3:21
 "Release" (Michael Nesmith) – 3:49
 "Winonah" (Michael Nesmith, Linda Hargrove, James Miner) – 3:56
 "Born to Love You" (Cindy Walker) – 3:55
 "The Back Porch and a Fruit Jar Full of Iced Tea" – 8:19
 a. "The F.F.V" (Traditional; arranged by Michael Nesmith)
 b. "Uncle Pen" (Bill Monroe)
 "Prairie Lullaby (Billy Hill)" – 4:12

Personnel
 Michael Nesmith – vocals, acoustic rhythm 12-string guitar
 Jay Lacy – electric guitar
 Dr. Robert K. Warford – electric guitar, banjo
 David Barry – piano
 Red Rhodes – pedal steel, dobro 
 Billy Graham – bass, fiddle
 Danny Lane – drums and percussion

References

1973 albums
Michael Nesmith albums
RCA Records albums